The Competition Bureau is the competition regulator in Canada. It is an independent Canadian law enforcement agency that ensures that markets operate in a competitive, innovative manner.

Headed by the Commissioner of Competition, the Competition Bureau is responsible for the administration and enforcement of the Competition Act.

Commissioner

The current commissioner of competition is Matthew Boswell. He served as senior deputy commissioner of competition before being appointed to his current position.

The commissioner is responsible for the administration and enforcement of the Competition Act and three labelling statutes, the Consumer Packaging and Labelling Act, the Precious Metals Marking Act and the Textile Labelling Act.

Under the Competition Act, the commissioner can launch inquiries, challenge civil and merger matters before the Competition Tribunal, make recommendations on criminal matters to the Public Prosecution Service of Canada, and intervene as a competition advocate before federal and provincial bodies.

As head of the Canadian Competition Bureau, the commissioner leads the bureau's participation in international fora such as the Organisation for Economic Co-operation and Development (OECD) and the International Competition Network (ICN), to develop and promote coordinated competition laws and policies in an increasingly globalized marketplace.

Organization
 Matthew Boswell — Commissioner of competition
Jeanne Pratt — Senior deputy commissioner, Mergers and Monopolistic Practices Branch
 Stéphane Lamoureux — Senior deputy commissioner, Cartels and Deceptive Marketing Practices Branch
 Anthony Durocher — Deputy commissioner, Competition Promotion Branch
 Mario Mainville — Executive director, Corporate Services Branch
Source:

Branches

Mergers and Monopolistic Practices Branch

The Mergers and Monopolistic Practices Branch reviews proposed merger transactions and investigates practices that could negatively impact competition. The Mergers Directorate reviews proposed mergers to assess whether the transactions are likely to substantially prevent or lessen competition in the marketplace. The Monopolistic Practices Directorate detects, investigates and deters business practices that have a negative impact on competition, such as abuse of dominance, as well as certain types of anti‑competitive agreements or arrangements between competitors.

Cartels and Deceptive Marketing Practices Branch

The Cartels and Deceptive Marketing Practices Branch fights criminal or deceptive business practices that hurt consumers and competition in the marketplace. The Cartels Directorate detects, investigates and deters genuine cartels, including conspiracies, agreements or arrangements among competitors and potential competitors to fix prices, rig bids, allocate markets or restrict supply. The directorate also reaches out to stakeholders engaged in procurement to enable them to detect and deter bid-rigging and other cartel activities. The Deceptive Marketing Practices Directorate detects, investigates and deters false or misleading representations and deceptive marketing practices identified under the Competition Act. The directorate also enforces related legislation, i.e. the Consumer Packaging and Labelling Act (except as it relates to food), the Precious Metals Marking Act and the Textile Labelling Act.

Competition Promotion Branch

The Competition Promotion Branch encourages the adoption of pro-competition positions, policies, and behaviours by businesses, consumers, regulators, government and international partners. The branch also provides economic analysis in support of enforcement, and leads the bureau's planning and reporting processes. Also within this branch is the International Affairs Directorate, which establishes working relationships with foreign competition law agencies and tribunals.

Corporate Services Branch

The Corporate Services Branch provides advice, planning and services for the effective operation of the bureau's financial, asset, information management and human resource activities, as well as access to information, privacy, values and ethics, security and procurement matters. The branch also provides expertise in complaint management and evidence collection and preservation in support of the bureau's mandate.

Legal support

Competition Bureau Legal Services (DOJ)

The Competition Bureau Legal Services of the Department of Justice is responsible for providing legal services to the commissioner and for representing the commissioner on all matters other than those for which the Public Prosecution Service of Canada is responsible.

Competition Law Section (PPSC)

The Competition Law Section of the Public Prosecution Service of Canada is responsible for initiating and conducting criminal prosecutions on behalf of the Attorney General of Canada and for advising the bureau on criminal investigations.

See also
 Canadian Anti-Fraud Centre

References

External links
 Competition Bureau website

Federal departments and agencies of Canada
Innovation, Science and Economic Development Canada
Competition regulators
Federal law enforcement agencies of Canada
Consumer organizations in Canada
Regulation in Canada